Perrotia silvestralis is a butterfly in the family Hesperiidae. It is found in Madagascar (north to the Antankara region). The habitat consists of forests.

References

Butterflies described in 1956
Erionotini